Steve Harney (born 1951) is an English former professional footballer who played as a right back.

Career
Born in Bradford, Harney played for Drum Rovers, Bradford City and Guiseley.

For Bradford City he made 14 appearances in the Football League.

Sources

References

1951 births
Living people
English footballers
Bradford City A.F.C. players
Guiseley A.F.C. players
English Football League players
Association football fullbacks